Amitabh Aurora (born 11 June 1982, Allahabad) is an Indian film director, screenwriter and actor. 
Aurora is best known for his Bongo films in the Swahili language and is cited as having written and directed ‘the first high quality Bongo movie from Zanzibar.’

Career
Aurora began his career in New Delhi, working as a stage actor for 4 years with New Delhi Players and Yatrik Theatre Group. He moved to Mumbai to be an actor where he worked acting in T.V. serials for 3 years.

He moved to Tanzania, East Africa in 2009 where he wrote and directed four feature films in Tanzania working for  leading producer of Bongo movies Zanzibar-based ZG Films. All his Swahili feature films featured in the 2012 Zanzibar International Film Festival. Black Magic was shortlisted in the Montreal International Black Film Festival in 2012. He also Line Produced several foreign productions in Tanzania for BBC London, M Net South Africa and Al Jazeera News .

Aurora moved back to India in 2012 and began work as Executive Producer in  Charlie Kay Chakkar Mein starring Naseeruddin Shah and as creative producer and additional dialogue writer in forthcoming film Chai Shai Biscuits both produced by Picture Thoughts Productions.

He directed and acted in several short films including Captain The Struggler, which was shortlisted in Paraj Mumbai Short Film Festival in 2014.

He wrote Television shows including Bani - Ishq Da Kalma and Kehta Hai Dil Jee Le Zara.
In 2015 he assisted Tigmanshu Dhulia on feature film Yaara.

He is the founder and creative director of Mumbai-based production house Have Camera Make Films (HCMF). In early 2016 HCMF received critical acclaim in the Deccan Chronicle for their short film "Free Basics" featuring popular South Indian actress Shradda Das. The Chronicle described it as a "brilliant production" bringing " to the fore the topic of sudden, unplanned and haphazard growth, urbanisation and development." Free Basics was part of the official selection for the Zanzibar International Film Festival 2017.

In 2018 he produced and directed the short film "Blink to Speak" for agency TBWA/India, created for a non-profit, Asha Ek Hope Foundation and NeuroGen Brain & Spine Institute, which won the Health Grand Prix for Good at the 2018 Cannes Lions International Festival of Creativity.

Filmography
Feature Films

Short Films

Acting

Writing credits

References

1982 births
Film directors from Uttar Pradesh
Indian male screenwriters
Male actors from Uttar Pradesh
Living people